Bradley is one of the 20 electoral wards that form the Parliamentary constituency of Pendle, Lancashire, England. The ward elects three councillors to represent the Bradley area, the north-west part of Nelson, on Pendle Borough Council. At the May 2011 Council election, Bradley had an electorate of 4,581.

This ward was subject to boundary changes in 2021, and an election took place on 6 May 2021 to elect all members of Pendle Borough Council in England. The ward returns two Labour Councillors, and one Conservative Councillor.

Demographics
Bradley has a high proportion of residents from ethnic minorities. 38.5 per cent of the population are of Pakistani origin.

2021 Election Results

Previous Election results

References

Wards of Pendle (UK Parliament constituency)